Steven Todd Kirby (born November 17, 1951) is an American politician of the Democratic Party. He is a member of the Washington House of Representatives, representing the 29th district.

Biography

Family 
Steve Kirby was born and raised in the 29th District, living in the same house in South Tacoma for over forty years before he and his wife, Beckie Summers, moved to Tacoma's Fern Hill neighborhood in 2002. They have five adult children and seven grandchildren.

Experience 
Steve Kirby was elected to the Tacoma City Council in 1979 at the age of 25 and served four terms. As a city councilman, he served on the Workforce Development Council Executive Board, the Tacoma-Pierce County Board of Health, the Tacoma Joint Municipal Action Committee, the Pierce Transit Board of Directors, and he was the first chairman of the Tacoma City Council's Public Safety Committee. Kirby was also declared an honorary member of the Tacoma Firefighters Local 31, Tacoma Police Local 6 and Tacoma Library Employees Local 120.

Steve Kirby has served on the House Rules Committee, the Agriculture Committee, the Technology Committee, the Capital Budget Committee, The Local Government and Housing Committee, the Public Safety and Emergency Preparedness Committee, the Organized Crime Advisory Board, and the Joint Executive Legislative Committee on Water Policy. He currently serves on the House Judiciary Committee, the Commerce and Gaming Committee, the Committee on Committees. He is also the chairman of the Business and Financial Services Committee.

In addition to his official civic duties, Steve Kirby is active in his community in other ways. He has been a member of the Tacoma Athletic Commission, the Tacoma Executives Association, the Pierce County Democratic Central Committee Executive Board, the Pierce County Young Democrats, the Southeast Lions Club, the Southeast Tacoma Optimist Club, the South End Neighborhood Center Advisory Board and the City of Tacoma Community Development Advisory Committee.

References

Democratic Party members of the Washington House of Representatives
Living people
1951 births
21st-century American politicians